Ken Gregory (1960) is a Canadian media artist who works with DIY interface design, hardware hacking, audio, video, and computer programming. He is based in Winnipeg, Manitoba.

Career
Gregory's work has been exhibited internationally in media art and sound art festivals.

Collections
Gregory's  work 12 Motor Bells is held in the collection of the National Gallery of Canada.

References

External links
Official Site

Canadian sound artists
Artists from Winnipeg
Living people
1960 births